Frederick Bertie Thompson (4 August 1880 – 19 December 1956) was a British track and field athlete who competed in the 1908 Summer Olympics in the Men's Marathon. He did not finish. dropping out after 15 miles. He also participated in amateur competition in racewalking,   and won the 1907  Amateur Athletic Association  7 mile championship with a  52:46.6 time.

References

1880 births
1956 deaths
Olympic athletes of Great Britain
Athletes (track and field) at the 1908 Summer Olympics
British male marathon runners